Palal was a son of Uzai (Neh. 3:25). Palal helped Nehemiah repair the wall of Jerusalem after the Babylonian captivity.

Hebrew Bible people
5th-century BCE Jews